Koluchan (also Romanized as Kolūchān, Kaloochan, Kalūchān, and Kelūchān) is a village in Jolgeh Rural District, in the Central District of Golpayegan County, Isfahan Province, Iran. At the 2006 census, its population was 368, in 125 families.

References 

Populated places in Golpayegan County